Claire Thompson may refer to:
 Claire Thompson (author)
 Claire Thompson (ice hockey)
 Claire Thompson (Doctors)

See also
 Clare Thompson, Australian tennis player
 Clare Thomson, British actor